Golden Spike is an annual athletics event at the Městský Stadion in Ostrava-Vítkovice, Czech Republic as part of the IAAF World Challenge Meetings. It was first organized in 1961.

The history of the meeting was interrupted in 1999, when the meeting was not held due to the apparent lack of interest of sponsors. From 2003 to 2009 the IAAF classified the  meeting among IAAF Grand Prix meetings.

World records
Over the course of its history, numerous world records have been set at the Golden Spike.

Meeting records

Men

Women

References

External links
Official website
Golden Spike Meeting Records

Annual track and field meetings
Athletics competitions in the Czech Republic
Sport in Ostrava
IAAF Grand Prix
IAAF World Challenge
Recurring sporting events established in 1961
1961 establishments in Czechoslovakia
IAAF Super Grand Prix
IAAF World Outdoor Meetings